Daveaua is a genus of flowering plants in the daisy family.

There is only one known species, Daveaua anthemoides, native to Portugal, Spain, Andorra, Gibraltar, Morocco, and Egypt.

References

Monotypic Asteraceae genera
Anthemideae